Abtao may refer to:

 Abtao Island, a Chilean island
 Battle of Abtao, an 1866 naval battle between Spain and the allied Peru and Chile
 Abtao-class submarine, a Peruvian Navy submarine class
 BAP Abtao, Peruvian submarine of the Abtao class and a museum ship 
 Chilean corvette Abtao, a Chilean Navy corvette

See also

 Antão